Swedish Professional Football Leagues (the Swedish Elite Football Association, SEF) is a Swedish interest organisation that represents the 32 elite football clubs in the top two divisions (Allsvenskan and Superettan) of the Swedish football league system. SEF does not administer the divisions but acts in cooperation with the Swedish Football Association, the member clubs, sponsors and partners. The goal is to develop Swedish elite football resultwise, economically, commercially and administratively.

History
Swedish Professional Football Leagues was founded in 1928 (under the name Föreningen Svenska Serien Division 1) as a counterpart to the Swedish Football Association, with which top division clubs did not have a well-functioning relationship at that time. The organisation was initially only for clubs playing in the top division Allsvenskan, but in 1939 it was changed so that former top division clubs relegated to Division 2 could remain members. The current name of the organisation was adopted in 1972, and the membership at the time included 14 Allsvenskan clubs, 28 clubs playing in Division 2 and an additional five clubs playing in the third division, Division 3. From 1986 on, it was decided to only give membership to clubs either playing in the top division or the second division (then called Division 1, which became Superettan in 2000).

Footnotes

Citations

References

External links
 

 
Allsvenskan
Superettan
1928 establishments in Sweden
Sports organizations established in 1928
Sports organizations of Sweden